Dejan Kelhar (born 5 April 1984) is a Slovenian footballer who plays for SV Übelbach as a defender.

Club career

Kelhar started playing football with Brežice, until he moved to Celje. He played there for two seasons in PrvaLiga. At the same time he also played for the Slovenian Second League side Krško, because Football Association of Slovenia regulations allowed to register youth players in two clubs from different league levels.

In 2004, Kelhar was transferred for €100,000 to SpVgg Greuther Fürth in the 2. Bundesliga. His transfer was not a big success and he returned to Celje. On 31 January 2009, the last day before the closing of the winter transfer window, Kelhar signed a contract with Cercle Brugge.

In February 2011, he joined Legia Warszawa on two and a half year contract.

In July 2012, Kelhar joined Gabala of the Azerbaijan Premier League on a two-year contract.
Kelhar's debut came on 4 August 2012 against Simurq in a game that also saw him score his first goal for the club after 15 minutes. Kelhar went on to play in 28 league and three Cup games for Gabala in his first season. Kelhar appeared seven times for Gabala in his second season before leaving in December 2013.

At the start of February 2014, Kelhar signed a six-month contract, with the option of another year, with Red Star Belgrade.

On 6 August 2014, Kelhar signed a short-term contract with English Championship side Sheffield Wednesday. Kelhar was released by Sheffield Wednesday at the end of the 2014–15 season, having not made an appearance for the club.

International career

Kelhar made his debut for the national side in friendly match against Qatar on 3 March 2010 in Maribor.

Career statistics

Club

International

Honours
Red Star
Serbian SuperLiga: 2013–14

References

External links

NZS profile 

1984 births
Living people
People from Brežice
Slovenian footballers
Slovenia youth international footballers
Slovenia under-21 international footballers
Slovenia international footballers
Association football defenders
NK Celje players
NK Krško players
NK Olimpija Ljubljana (1945–2005) players
SpVgg Greuther Fürth players
Cercle Brugge K.S.V. players
Legia Warsaw players
Hapoel Haifa F.C. players
Samsunspor footballers
Gabala FC players
Red Star Belgrade footballers
Sheffield Wednesday F.C. players
NK Olimpija Ljubljana (2005) players
Sivasspor footballers
Slovenian Second League players
Slovenian PrvaLiga players
2. Bundesliga players
Belgian Pro League players
Ekstraklasa players
Süper Lig players
Israeli Premier League players
Slovenian expatriate footballers
Slovenian expatriate sportspeople in Belgium
Slovenian expatriate sportspeople in Turkey
Slovenian expatriate sportspeople in Germany
Slovenian expatriate sportspeople in Poland
Slovenian expatriate sportspeople in Israel
Slovenian expatriate sportspeople in Azerbaijan
Slovenian expatriate sportspeople in Serbia
Slovenian expatriate sportspeople in England
Slovenian expatriate sportspeople in Austria
Expatriate footballers in Belgium
Expatriate footballers in Turkey
Expatriate footballers in Germany
Expatriate footballers in Poland
Expatriate footballers in Israel
Expatriate footballers in Azerbaijan
Expatriate footballers in Serbia
Expatriate footballers in England
Expatriate footballers in Austria